Mongolia competed at the 2014 Summer Youth Olympics, in Nanjing, China from 16 August to 28 August 2014.

Medalists

Judo

Mongolia qualified two athletes based on its performance at the 2013 Cadet World Judo Championships.

Individual

Team

Shooting

Mongolia qualified one shooter based on its performance at the 2014 Asian Shooting Championships.

Individual

Team

Weightlifting

Mongolia qualified 1 quota in the girls' events based on the team ranking after the 2014 Weightlifting Youth & Junior Asian Championships.

Girls

Wrestling

Mongolia qualified one athlete based on its performance at the 2014 Asian Cadet Championships.

Girls

References

2014 in Mongolian sport
Nations at the 2014 Summer Youth Olympics
Mongolia at the Youth Olympics